Lilabari Airport , also known as North Lakhimpur Airport, is a domestic airport serving the city of North Lakhimpur in Assam, India.

History
The Lilabari airport project in Lakhimpur began following hectic campaigning and lobbying by local Member of Parliament (MP), Dr Ranee Narah from 1999 to 2003. Construction of the airport had finished by 2003, and the terminal was inaugurated by then Union Civil Aviation Minister Syed Shahnawaz Hussain.

Current status
 As of 2013, the Lilabari airport in Lakhimpur is connected to Kolkata by an Air India Regional service on a daily basis.
 The airport is equipped with a night landing facility, and the runway is being modified to operate larger aircraft.

Airlines and destinations

Statistics

See also
 Dibrugarh Airport
 Rupsi Airport
 Silchar Airport
 Tezpur Airport

References

External links

Lilabari Airport at the AAI

North Lakhimpur
Airports in Assam
Airports established in 2003
2003 establishments in Assam